Gulbenkian is an Armenian surname. It may refer to:

People
Calouste Gulbenkian, an Armenian businessman
Nubar Gulbenkian, his son, also a businessman
Angela Gulbenkian, Art collector
Kémar Gulbenkian, member of French group No One Is Innocent

Other
Calouste Gulbenkian Foundation, a charitable institution
Instituto Gulbenkian de Ciência, a research facility
Calouste Gulbenkian Museum, a museum in Lisbon
Gulbenkian Prize, series of awards for museums and galleries, for sciences, human rights
Gulbenkian Ballet, a ballet troupe (1965-2005)
Gulbenkian Theatre, a theatre in Canterbury
Gulbenkian Orchestra, an orchestra in Lisbon
Gulbenkian Park, also known as Gulbenkian Garden, garden with lakes located in Lisbon, Portugal
Avenida Calouste Gulbenkian, a major avenue in Lisbon 

Armenian-language surnames